Jason Charles Miller is an American musician, singer and songwriter known for his solo albums as well as being the lead vocalist and guitarist of the industrial rock band Godhead. He is a voice actor in various animation and video games. He is also part of the duo The Deadly Grind, and the duo RezoDrone.  He has released solo albums in the country music, southern rock and Americana (music) genres.

Early life
In 1977, at the age of 5, Miller moved with his family to Clifton, Virginia where he would spend the remainder of his youth. Miller began singing opera music and playing the guitar while young, and began performing when he was six. He has three stepbrothers and one stepsister.

Career
Miller is frontman and founder of the industrial rock band Godhead which was the only band signed to Marilyn Manson's Posthuman Records. Under Posthuman Records, Godhead released their fourth studio album 2000 Years of Human Error, which has sold over 100,000 copies in the United States. While a member of Godhead, Miller toured the world with Marilyn Manson, Ozzy Osbourne, Black Sabbath, Disturbed, GWAR, Slipknot, Rammstein, Linkin Park, and Jonathan Davis (Korn). In 2002, Godhead's song "Penetrate" was re-released on the Queen of the Damned soundtrack under Warner Music Group. The song earned Miller a Golden Record Award for sales. The band has sold over 250,000 albums worldwide.

After more than a decade as frontman of Godhead, Miller began creating music as a solo artist. On October 27, 2009, Miller released his first solo EP, Last to Go Home, under Count Mecha Music. On October 10, 2011, Miller released his first solo album, Uncountry. On July 3, 2012, Miller released his second full-length studio album entitled Natural Born Killer under Count Mecha Music. In 2004, Miller collaborated with Ben Moody and Jason 'Gong' Jones of Drowning Pool for the song "The End Has Come", which appeared on the soundtrack of the film The Punisher and earned Miller his second Golden Record Award for sales. Miller has also appeared on multiple Cleopatra Records tribute albums along with Julian Beeston, formerly of Nitzer Ebb. Miller's music was featured in the pilot of Hung. Miller was asked by Bret Michaels to remix the Rock of Love theme song for the Poison frontman's Custom Made solo album.  Miller's songwriting can be heard on the WWE Smackdown theme "Hangman", which was recorded by (and co-written with) the rock band Rev Theory. In May 2012, Miller released the single "Up to Me". Miller has been featured in magazines such as Rolling Stone, Billboard, Guitar World, and Inside Kung Fu.  He has appeared on MTV, MTV2, Fuse TV, and VH1.

Miller relocated to Los Angeles in 2001, where he owns a recording studio and works as a recording artist, writer and producer, voice-over artist and actor. Splitting time between Los Angeles and Nashville, his love for country and blues music has intensified, as has the influence of those that have defined his musical roots: Johnny Cash, Neil Young, Kris Kristofferson, Merle Haggard, Fleetwood Mac, Bad Company. His first single, "You Get What You Pay For", was featured in the HBO hit series True Blood, and included appearances from Felicia Day and Greg Grunberg in its music video. The Uncountry music video features guests such as Robert Picardo and Grant Imahara.

As a voice actor, Miller has appeared in over 100 animated productions and video games. Some of his credits include work on World of Warcraft, Wonder Woman, Ghost in the Shell: Stand Alone Complex, Hellsing, Read or Die and the Nickelodeon Nicktoon Avatar: The Last Airbender. His film credits include Danny Roane: First Time Director, the 2008 remake of Day of the Dead and the Sci Fi Channel's Battle Planet. He worked on a cover album from the fighting game series Guilty Gear, titled Guilty Gear XX in N.Y. Vocal Edition, where he supplied vocals over the instrumentals to create a full vocal album. In 2011, he lent his vocals to another cover album, this time for BlazBlue, the successive fighting game series to Guilty Gear, titles BlazBlue in L.A. Vocal Edition. He provided the voice of Robert Kendo in Capcom's video game Resident Evil: The Darkside Chronicles for the Wii. In 2011, he appeared in an episode of the web series The Guild. His voice can be heard in the digital collectible card game by Blizzard Entertainment, Hearthstone. Since 2017, he is part of the duo The Deadly Grind. In 2019, Miller was the co-lead singer for the song "Shadowbringers", the theme song for Final Fantasy XIV'''s third expansion of the same name; and then in 2020, he provided vocals for the game's song "To The Edge". In 2021, Miller contributed vocals to Final Fantasy XIV's Endwalker expansion launch trailer.

 Discography 

Godhead
 America Now (1995 compilation)
 Godhead (1996)
 Nothingness (1997)
 Powertool Stigmata (1998)
 2000 Years of Human Error (2001)
 Evolver (2003)
 Non-Stop Ride (2004 remix compilation)
 The Shadow Line (2006)
 Unplugged (2007 EP)
 At the Edge of the World (2008)
 The Shadow Re-Aligned (2014)

Solo
 Last to Go Home (2009)
 Uncountry (2011)
 Natural Born Killer (2012)
 In the Wasteland (2018)
 UnDeadwood: Chapter I soundtrack (2019)
 From the Wreckage - Part I (2021)
 From the Wreckage - Part II (2021)

The Deadly Grind
 Songs from Foreververse'' (2017)

Roles

Animation

Video games

Television and web series

References

External links
Official website
Twitter

Living people
American country rock singers
American country singer-songwriters
American male singer-songwriters
American rock guitarists
American male guitarists
American male voice actors
American male video game actors
Alternative metal musicians
American industrial musicians
Nu metal singers
Alternative metal guitarists
Godhead (band) members
People from Clifton, Virginia
21st-century American singers
21st-century American guitarists
21st-century American male singers
Year of birth missing (living people)